Ministério da Justiça, the Portuguese for "Ministry of Justice", may refer in English to either of:

 Ministry of Justice (Portugal)
 Ministry of Justice (Brazil)